A coachbuilder or body-maker is someone who manufactures bodies for passenger-carrying vehicles. Coachwork is the body of an automobile, bus, horse-drawn carriage, or railway carriage. The word "coach" was derived from the Hungarian town of Kocs. A vehicle body constructed by a coachbuilder may be called a "coachbuilt body" (British English) or "custom body" (American English).

Prior to the popularization of unibody construction in the 1960s, there were many independent coachbuilders who built bodies on chassis provided by a manufacturer, often for luxury or sports cars. Many manufacturers such as Ferrari outsourced all bodywork to coachbuilders such as Pininfarina and Scaglietti. Coachbuilders also made custom bodies for individual customers. The coachbuilder craftsmen who might once have built bespoke or custom bodies continue to build bodies for short runs of specialized commercial vehicles such as luxury motor coaches or recreational vehicles or motor-home bodied upon a rolling chassis provided by an independent manufacturer. A 'conversion' is built inside an existing vehicle body.

Several renowned automotive coachbuilders, including Pininfarina, Bertone, and Ghia, are based in Italy. In the Italian language, a coachbuilder is called a carrozzeria.

Horse-drawn origins

A British trade association the Worshipful Company of Coachmakers and Coach Harness Makers was incorporated in 1630. Some British coachmaking firms operating in the 20th century were established even earlier. Rippon was active in the time of Queen Elizabeth I, Barker founded in 1710 by an officer in Queen Anne's Guards. Brewster, the oldest in the U.S., was formed in 1810.

Coach-building had reached a high degree of specialization in Britain by the middle of the 19th century. Separate branches of the trade dealt with the timber, iron, leather, brass and other materials used in their construction. And there were many minor specialists with each of these categories. The “body-makers” produced the body or vehicle itself, while the “carriage-makers” made the stronger timbers beneath and around the body. The timbers used included ash, beech, elm, oak, mahogany, cedar, pine, birch and larch. The tools and processes used were similar to those used in cabinet-making, plus other specific to coach-making. Making the curved woodwork alone called for considerable skill. Making the iron axles, springs and other metal used was the work of the “coach-smith,” one of the most highly paid classes of London workmen. The coating of the interior of the coach with leather and painting, trimming, and decorating the exterior called for specialist tradesmen with a high degree of skill. Building carts and wagons required similar skills, but of a coarser kind.

Automobiles
From the beginning of the automobile industry manufacturers offered complete cars assembled in their own factories commonly using entire bodies made by specialist people using different skills. Soon after the start of the twentieth century mass production coachbuilders developed such as  Mulliners or Pressed Steel in Great Britain, Fisher Body, Budd, Briggs in the U. S., or Ambi-Budd in Germany. Many other big businesses remain involved.

Specialist market sector
There remained a market for bodies to fit low production, short-run and luxury cars. Custom or bespoke bodies were made and fitted to another manufacturer's rolling chassis by the craftsmen who had previously built bodies for horse-drawn carriages. Bespoke bodies are made of hand-shaped sheet metal, often aluminum alloy. Pressed or hand-shaped the metal panels were fastened to a wooden frame of particularly light but strong types of wood. Later many of the more important structural features of the bespoke or custom body such as A, B and C pillars were cast alloy components. Some bodies such as those entirely alloy bodies fitted to some Pierce-Arrow cars contained little or no wood, and were mounted on a conventional steel chassis.

The car manufacturer would offer for sale a chassis frame, drivetrain (consisting of an engine, gearbox, differential, axles, and wheels), brakes, suspension, steering system, lighting system, spare wheel(s), front and rear mudguards (vulnerable and so made of pressed steel for strength and easy repair) and (later) bumpers, scuttle (firewall) and dashboard. The very easily damaged honeycomb radiator, later enclosed and protected by a shell or even reduced to an air intake, was or held the visual element identifying the chassis' brand. To let car manufacturers maintain some level of control over the final product their warranties could be voided if coachbuilders fitted unapproved bodies.

As well as bespoke bodies the same coachbuilders also made short runs of more-or-less identical bodies to the order of dealers or the manufacturer of a chassis. The same body design might then be adjusted to suit different brands of chassis. Examples include Salmons & Sons' Tickford bodies with a patent device to raise or lower a convertible's roof, first used on their 19th-century carriages, or Wingham convertible bodies by Martin Walter.

Obsolescence
Separate coachbuilt bodies became obsolete when vehicle manufacturers found they could no longer meet their customers' demands by relying on a simple separate chassis (on which a custom or bespoke body could be built) mounted on leaf springs on beam axles. Unibody or monocoque combined chassis and body structures became standardised during the middle years of the 20th century to provide the rigidity required by improved suspension systems without incurring the heavy weight, and consequent fuel penalty of a truly rigid separate chassis. The improved more supple suspension systems gave vehicles better road-holding and much improved the ride experienced by passengers.

Ultra-luxury vehicles

 

Larger car dealers or distributors would commonly preorder stock chassis and the bodies they thought most likely to sell and order them for sale off their showroom floor.

All luxury vehicles during the automobile's Golden Era before World War II were available as chassis only. For example, when Duesenberg introduced their Model J, it was offered as chassis only, for $8,500. Other examples include the Bugatti Type 57, Cadillac V-16, Packard Twelve, Ferrari 250, Isotta Fraschini Tipo 8, Hispano-Suiza J12, and all Rolls-Royces produced before World War II. Delahaye had no in-house coachworks, so all its chassis were bodied by independents, who created their designs on the Type 135. For the Delahaye, most were bodied by Chapron, Labourdette, Franay, Saoutchik, Figoni et Falaschi, or Pennock. 

The practice continued after World War II waning dramatically in the 1950s and 1960s. Rolls-Royce debuted its first unibody model, their Silver Shadow, in 1965.

Unibody construction

Independent coachbuilders survived for a time after the mid-20th century, making bodies for the chassis produced by low-production companies such as Rolls-Royce, Ferrari, and Bentley. Producing body dies is extremely expensive (a single door die can run to US$40,000), which is usually only considered practical when large numbers are involved—though that was the path taken by Rolls-Royce and Bentley after 1945 for their own in-house production. Because dies for pressing metal panels are so costly, from the mid 20th century, many vehicles, most notably the Chevrolet Corvette, were clothed with large panels of fiberglass-reinforced resin, which only require inexpensive molds. Glass has since been replaced by more sophisticated materials, if necessary hand-formed. Generally, these replace metal only where weight is of paramount importance.

The advent of unibody construction, where the car body is unified with and structurally integral to the chassis, made custom coachbuilding uneconomic. Many coachbuilders closed down, were bought by manufacturers, or changed their core business to other activities:
Transforming into dedicated design or styling houses, subcontracting to automotive brands (e.g. Zagato, Frua, Bertone, Pininfarina)
Transforming into general coachwork series manufacturers, subcontracting to automotive brands (e.g. Karmann, Bertone, Vignale, Pininfarina)
Manufacturing runs of special coachworks for trucks, delivery vans, touring cars, ambulances, fire engines, public transport vehicles, etc. (e.g., Pennock, Van Hool, Plaxton, Heuliez)
Becoming technical partners for the development of roof constructions (e.g., Karmann, Heuliez), for example, or producers of various (aftermarket) automotive parts (e.g., Giannini)

Gallery

List of coachbuilders

Austria

Ambruster
Keibl

Belgium

D'Ieteren
Grümmer (Bruxelles)
Simons
Vanden Plas
Van Hool

Denmark

Carsten Jakobsen

France

Achard, Fontanel & Cie (Lyon)
Ailloud & Dumond (Lyon)
Alin & Liautard (Courbevoie)
Amiot (Dinard, Dinan)
Angé (Toulouse)
Ansart & Teisseire (Neuilly)
Antem (Levallois)
Arnault (Garches)
Arqué (Toulouse)
Aubertin (Levallois-Perret)
Paul Audineau (Levallois)
Augereau (Brou)
Autobineau (Neuilly)
Bail (Paris)
Baqué (Toulouse)
Barbier (Cannes)
Bedel (Trouville-sur-mer)
Belvallette (Paris, Neuilly)
Bergeon & Descoins (Bordeaux)
Berlioz & Gouillon (Paris)
Berluteau (Melun)
Bernin (Tours)
Besset (Annonay)
Bigatti (Nice)
Billeter & Cartier (Lyon)
Binder (Paris)
Blanc & Barral (Paris)
Blesser (Paris)
Blois (Toulouse)
Boneberge (Lyon)
Bonneville & Chabrol (Toulouse)
Gustave Borde (Dijon)
Boré (Saint-Lô)
Boschet (Saint-Brieuc)
Bounet (Toulouse)
Bouteiller (Nantes)
Brandone (Cannes)
Bruand (Chaumont)
Henri Bretonniere (Nantes, Brittany)
Gratien Calmettes (Toulouse)
Candelaresi (Lyon)
Carrier (Argenteuil, Alençon)
Chabrol (Toulouse)
Candelarési (Lyon)
Carde & fils (Bordeaux)
Chappe et Gessalin, (Brie-Comte-Robert)
Chapron (Levallois-Perret)
Philippe Charbonneaux
Chatellard (Toulouse)
Chaussende (Lyon)
Chausson (Asnières, Gennevilliers)
Chéreau (Avranches)
Chicot (Levallois)
Chilbourg (Paris)
Clabot (Alfortville)
Clochez (Paris)
Cluzeau (Bergerac)
Cottard (Bourg-en-Bresse)
Crouzier frères (Moulins)
Currus (Paris)
Darl'mat (Paris)
Declerq & Cordonnier (Lille, Roubaix)
DeCostier (Boulogne s/Seine)
Decultil & Cie (Lyon)
Victor Delassale (Paris)
Delaroche & Turquet (Le Mans)
Delaugère (Orléans)
Deloche (Paris)
Desouches, David & Cie (Pantin)
Desvaux (Rueil)
Di Rosa (La Garenne-Colombes)
Drouet & Gaucher (Courbevoie)
Maurice Dumas (Bordeaux)
Louis Dubos (Neuilly)
Dubos (Puteaux)
Duhamel et Compagnie (Paris)
Duvivier (Levallois-Perret)
Ehrler (Paris)
Ehmgard et Delbenque (Paris)
Esclassan – Tôlerie automobile et industrielle (Boulogne s/Seine)
Facel-Métallon (Dreux)
Faget & Varnet (Levallois)
Faurax (Paris since 1808, later Lyon)
Faurax & Chaussende (since 1920, Lyon)
Felber frères (Puteaux)
Fernandez & Darrin (Paris)
Figoni et Falaschi (Boulogne s/Seine)
Firmin (Paris)
Fleury (Thonon)
Floquet (Saint-Amand)
Forrler (Strasbourg)
Fournier (Bordeaux)
Fournier (Suresnes)
Franay (Levallois-Perret)
Frugier (Toulouse, Limoges)
Gallé (Boulogne s/Seine)
Gangloff (Colmar)
Garros (Toulouse)
Gaudichet & Turquet (Le Mans)
Henri Gauthier (Villeurbanne, Beaulieu-Audincourt)
Gilotte (Courbevoie)
Girardo frères (Cannes)
Grange frères (Valence-sur-Rhône)
Gras (Dijon)
Gruau (Laval)
Grümmer (Clichy)
Guérard (Nice)
Guetting (Paris)
Guilloré (Courbevoie)
Guilloux (Châlon-sur-Saone)
Guldener (Marseille)
Hamet (Limoges)
Léon Hanovre (Paris)
Hénon (Albert)
Henry (Nancy)
Heuliez (Cerizay)
Hibbard & Darrin (Paris)
Jamet (La Guerche, Berry)
Jeanteaud (Paris)
L. Jean (Versailles)
Jouan, carrosserie de cuirs (Clichy)
Jousse & Parsy (Montargis)
Justrobe (Toulouse)
Kellner (Paris)
Kelsch (Levallois)
Klapper (Toulouse)
Kraemers fils (Paris)
Labarre (Evreux)
Labbé (Lamballe)
Henri Labourdette (Paris)
La Carrosserie Industrielle (Courbevoie)
Lacoste frères (Toulouse)
Lagache & Glaszmann (Montrouge)
Lagogué (Alençon)
Lamplugh & Cie (Levallois-Perret)
Langütt (Besançon)
Laporte (Toulouse)
Le Bastard (Rouen)
Leffondré (Groslay)
Letourneur et Marchand (Neuilly)
Le Vieux (Paris)
Lourtioux (Montluçon)
Mamy (Besançon)
Mandement (Toulouse)
Manessius (Puteaux)
Maron-Pot (Levallois-Perret)
Massias (Toulouse)
Mercier (Toulouse)
Meulemeester (Clichy)
Michel (Nice, Marseille)
Mignot & Billebault (Boulogne s/Seine)
Million Guiet (Levallois)
Léon Molon (Le Havre)
Mouche & Cie (Lyon)
Monjardet (Besançon)
Montel & fils (Marseille)
Morel (Paris)
Morin (Parthenay)
Morin (Rennes)
Mühlbacher & fils (Puteaux)
Nicolas (Angoulême)
Ottin (Lyon)
Philippe Mühlbacher (Toulouse)
Pelpel (Noyal s/Vilaine)
Petitprez & Verschure (Tourcoing)
Pezet (Toulouse)
Phaetonia (Courbevoie)
Société Phocéenne (Marseille)
Pichon-Parat (Sens)
Henri Pique (Toulouse)
Plante (Pau)
Poinsenet (Epernay)
Pourtout (Rueil-Malmaison)
Pralavorio Simon (Lyon Montplaisir)
Privat (Dijon)
Maurice Proux (Courbevoie)
Pruneville (Lyon)
Radovitch (Reims)
Rambert & fils (Clermont-Ferrand, Courbevoie)
Raquin (Montrichard)
Rasp (Paris)
Ravistre & Martel (Annonay)
Repusseau & Cie (Levallois-Perret)
Rétif (Sancoins, Berry)
Rheims & Auscher, La Carrosserie Industrielle (Levallois-Perret)
Rieucros (Cognac)
Georges Rigier (Neuilly)
Alexis Robert (Paris)
Rothschild, later Rheims & Aucher (Levallois-Perret)
Rotrou (Verneuil sur Avre)
Rousseau (Montargis)
Rungette (Levallois-Perret)
Saoutchik (Neuilly)
Soulé (Toulouse)
Spinnewyn (Tourcoing)
Surirey (Flers)
Tassé (Pontchâteau)
Benjamin Thibaut (Toulouse)
Baptiste Thomas (1820–1877, Paris)
Tirbois (Niort)
Tizot & Viguier (Marseille)
Tremble (Puteaux)
Tual (Tredion)
Vallas (St-Just en Chevalet)
Van den Bussche (Lille)
Van den Hende (Roubaix)
Vanvooren (Courbevoie)
Vedrine & Cie (Courbevoie)
Verplancke (Roubaix)
Veuillet (Fleurieu-sur-Seine)
Vidal (Toulouse)
de Villars (Courbevoie)
Vilotte (Toulouse)
Vinet (Neuilly)
Visse & Haf (Levallois)
Vivez (Bordeaux)
VOG (Chartres, Neuilly)
Wanaverbecq (Lambersart)
Wantz (Meaux)
Warengehm (Levallois-Perret)
Weymann (Paris)
Widerkehr (Colmar)
Willy van den Plas (Paris, Lille)

Germany

Ambi-Budd
Auer
Autenrieth
Baur
Binz
Buhne
Deutsch
Dörr & Schreck
Drauz
Erdmann & Rossi
Friederich
Gläser
Glüer
Grümmer (Aachen)
Hebmüller
Ihle
Kässbohrer
Karmann
Kathe
Keinath
Kellner
Konigsberg
Kruse (Husum)
Kühlstein
Kühn
Johann Michael Mayer (München)
Mengelbier (Aachen)
Neoplan
Neuss
Nowack
Papler
Plenikowski (Hartha)
Rembrandt
Reutter
Rometsch
Setra
Spohn
Styling Garage
Szase
Voll & Ruhrbeck
Weinberger, Karl
Weinberger, Ludwig
Weinsberg
Wendler

Indonesia
Adi Putro
Laksana
Morodadi Prima
New Armada
Tentrem

Italy

Allemano
Bertone
Bizzarrini
Boano
Boneschi
Castagna
Cecomp
Coggiola
Colli
De Simon
Farina
Fissore
Frua
Garavini
Giannini
Ghia
Giugiaro
I.DE.A
Italdesign
Lombardi
Maggiora
Marazzi
MAT
Morelli
Motto
Nembo
OSI
Pininfarina
Sala
Scaglietti
Sports Cars (Drogo)
Studiotorino
Touring
Varesina
Vignale
Viotti
Zagato

Japan
Mitsuoka

Spain

Abadal
Ayats
Bettla
Blancou
Capella
Carrizo
J Farré
Forcada
Fiol
Galo Mateos
Herrero
Hijos de Labourdette
Irizar
Lucas
Molist
Reynés
Roqueta
Serra
Vert
Vidal

Sweden

Hoflageribolaget
Nordberg
Norrmalm

Switzerland

Beutler
Gangloff
Geismeister
Graber
Hermann Graber
Ramseier
Worblaufen

The Netherlands

Akkermans
Bronkhorst
Bij 't Vuur
Dolk
Donderwinkel
Egbers
Garstman
Gips & Jacobs
Hermans
Hover & Tiwi
Hulsman
Jac Met
Kimman
Lathouwers
Van Leersum & Co
De Ley
Van Lijf & Co
Mudde
Muller
Mijnhardt
N.A.M. (Nederlandsche Auto-Maatschappij)
Nederlandsche Carrosseriefabrieken
Oostwoud
Pennock
Van Rijswijk & Zoon
Roos
Schutter & van Bakel
Smulders
Soudijn
Spyker
Jean Stegen
Teulings
W J Van Trigt & Zoon
Vandenbrink Design
Verheul
Veth & Zoon

United Kingdom

Abbey
Abbott
Alexander Dennis (formerly Walter Alexander Coachbuilders)
Aston Martin
Barker
Carbodies
Carlton
Crayford Engineering
Charlesworth
Corsica
Croall
Cunard
Gordon England
Flewitt
Freestone and Webb
Grose
J Gurney Nutting & Co
Harrington
John Hatchett (London)
Holmes (London)
Hooper
Jarvis of Wimbledon
Jensen
John Charles
Hoyal
Lancefield
Martin Walter
Arthur Mulliner
H. J. Mulliner & Co.
Mulliner Park Ward
Mulliners (Birmingham)
Nu-Track
Optare
Park Ward
Harold Radford
Rippon Bros
Salmons
Swallow
Tickford
Thrupp & Maberly
Vanden Plas
Vince & Son
Walter Alexander Coachbuilders
Wesleys Newport Pagnell
Vincent of Reading
Windovers
Wingham Martin Walter
Wrightbus
James Young

United States

Alex Madjaric Body Works
Abbot-Downing
Biddle and Smart (Amesbury)
Bohman & Schwartz
Brewster
Briggs
Brunn
Budd
Coachcraft
Darrin of Paris
Demarest
Derham
Dietrich Inc.
Earl Automobile Works
Fisher
Albert Fisher (Detroit)
Fleetwood
Holbrook
Judkins
KEM Motorworks
LeBaron
Locke
Murphy
Murray
Rollson
Rollston
Rubay
Studebaker
Towson
Walker
Waterhouse
Widman
Willoughby
Wilson

Survivors of the unibody production-line system

Coway 
Jankel 
Jubilee 
MacNeillie 
Overfinch
Wilcox
Woodall-Nicholson

See also
 Bus manufacturing
 Carriage
 Chassis
 Unibody
 Wainwright

Notes

References

External links

Coachbuild.com: Encyclopedia of worldwide Coachbuilders from past to present
Encyclopedia of American Coachbuilders
Goldarths: The Fine Art of Coachbuilding
The Kellner Affair: Matters of Life and Death by Peter M. Larsen and Ben Erickson. Details Jacques Kellner and George Paulin involvement in the French Resistance.